Misala Pramenković (born 22 December 1980) is a Serbian politician. An ethnic Bosniak, she served in the National Assembly of Serbia from 2020 to 2022 as a member of the Justice and Reconciliation Party (Stranka pravde i pomirenja, SPP). She is currently a member of the Novi Pazar city assembly and of Serbia's Bosniak National Council.

Early life and private career
Pramenković was born in the village of Moroni in Tutin, in the Sandžak region of what was then the Socialist Republic of Serbia in the Socialist Federal Republic of Yugoslavia. She graduated from the Gazi Isa-beg school in Novi Pazar, continued her education at the Faculty of Islamic Studies at the University of Sarajevo in Bosnia and Herzegovina, and earned a master's degree and a Ph.D from the International University in Novi Pazar. She has published widely in her field.

Politician

Early years (2010–20)
Serbia organized the first direct elections for the country's national minority councils in 2010. Pramenković was elected to the Bosniak National Council that year on the electoral list of Chief Mufti Muamer Zukorlić's Bosniak Cultural Community, which won seventeen mandates, as against thirteen for the Bosniak List led by Sulejman Ugljanin and five for the Bosniak Renaissance list of Rasim Ljajić. These results were extremely contentious, and the legitimacy of the Bosniak Cultural Community's victory was contested by both the Serbian government and Ugljanin's party. The council's responsibilities were officially suspended soon after the election, although Zukorlić's group continued to oversee what it described as council meetings in defiance of the government's decision.

Pramenković became a member of the Bosniak Democratic Union of Sandžak (Bošnjačka demokratska zajednica Sandžaka, BDZ Sandžak) on its formation in 2013. The BDZ Sandžak contested the 2014 Serbian parliamentary election on the Liberal Democratic Party's electoral list, and Pramenković was included in the 123rd position. The list did not cross the electoral threshold for assembly representation.

A new election was organized for the Bosniak National Council in 2014, and Pramenković received the sixth position on Zukorlić's For Bosniaks, Sandžak and the Mufti list. The only other list to appear on the ballot was Ugljanin's For Bosniak Unity. Ugljanin's list won the election, nineteen seats to sixteen. Zukorlić's group initially raised concerns about electoral fraud but ultimately accepted the results, and Pramenković served as a member of the opposition.

Pramenković appeared in the third position on the BDZ Sandžak's list in the 2016 Serbian parliamentary election and narrowly missed election when the list won two seats. She also received the third position on the party's list for the Novi Pazar city assembly in the concurrent 2016 Serbian local elections and was elected when the list won ten seats. The BDZ Sandžak was restructured as the Justice and Reconciliation Party in 2017, and she became a member of the new party.

Pramenković was promoted to the third position on the Mufti's list for the 2018 Bosniak National Council election and was re-elected when the list won thirteen seats. As in 2014, Zukorlić's list was narrowly defeated by Ugljanin's. Following the election, Ugljanin's group formed a coalition with a third list aligned with Ljajić, and the Zukorlić faction remained in opposition.

Parliamentarian (2020–22)
Pramenković received the third position on the SPP's list in the 2020 Serbian parliamentary election and was elected when the list won four mandates. The Serbian Progressive Party (Srpska napredna stranka, SNS) and its allies won a landslide majority victory in the election; the SPP did not afterward join Serbia's SNS-led coalition government but provided it with outside support. In parliament, Pramenković was a member of the committee on the rights of the child (and its working group for initiatives, petitions, and proposals), a deputy member of the committee on the diaspora and Serbs in the region, and a member of the parliamentary friendship groups with Bosnia and Herzegovina, Kuwait, Saudi Arabia, Syria, Turkey, the United Kingdom, and the United States of America. She attracted some attention as the first elected representative in the Serbian national assembly to wear a hijab; in a 2021 interview, she said that she had not experienced any discrimination on this basis.

She also received the tenth position on the SPP's list for the Novi Pazar assembly in the 2020 local elections and was re-elected when the list won eleven mandates.

Pramenković was given the fourth position on the SPP's list in the 2022 Serbian parliamentary election. The list won three mandates, and she was not re-elected. She is now the next candidate slated to enter the assembly if any of elected SPP members leave in the current term.

2022 Bosniak National Council election
Pramenković is currently leading the SPP's electoral list for the Bosniak National Council in the 2022 national minority council elections, which will take place on 13 November.

References

1980 births
Living people
Bosniaks of Serbia
Politicians from Novi Pazar
People from Tutin, Serbia
Members of the National Assembly (Serbia)
Members of the Bosniac National Council (Serbia)
Bosniak Democratic Union of Sandžak politicians
Justice and Reconciliation Party politicians
Women members of the National Assembly (Serbia)